George Hidipo Hamba Kambala (born 9 May 1992) is a Namibian youth activist who along with Job Amupanda and Dimbulukeni Nauyoma co-founded a radical youth movement known as the Affirmative Repositioning in 2014 to advocate for land among Namibian youths. He also served in the SWAPO Youth League before his subsequent expulsion for his involvement in the youth movement.

Personal life 
Kambala was born and grew up in Windhoek's Katutura where he attended Martti Ahtisaari Primary School. He was part of the SWAPO Party Youth League leaders who were suspended and expelled from the party for occupying a plot in an upmarket Windhoek suburb.

His father, Kambala senior was a driver while his mother was a nurse in Windhoek.

Affirmative Repositioning Movement 
In 2014 Following reports by The Namibian newspaper that Windhoek Mayor Agnes Kafula allocated a plot to a Big Brother Africa winner, Kambala alongside Nauyoma and Amupanda occupied land in a Windhoek suburb to raise more concerns on the land question in Namibia claiming many Namibians do not have access to affordable housing.

References 

Living people
1992 births
Politicians from Windhoek
SWAPO politicians
Namibian activists

External link
George Kambala Facebook